Shamim Azad (born 11 November 1952) is a Bangladeshi-born British bilingual poet, storyteller and writer.

Early life
Azad was born in Mymensingh, Dhaka, East Bengal (now Bangladesh) (the town where her father worked), her hometown was Sylhet. She passed her SSC from Jamalpur Girls High School in 1967 and passed her Intermediate from Tangail Kumudini College in 1969. She enrolled in Dhaka University and gained an Honours degree in 1972 and a master's degree in 1973.

In 1990, Azad came to England.

Career
Azad's work ranges from Bangladeshi to European folktales. Her performance fuses the lines between education and entertainment and her workshops are rooted in Asian folk, oral traditions and heritage.

Azad has published 37 books including novels, collections of short stories, essays and poems in both English and Bengali and has been included in various anthologies including British South Asian Poetry, My Birth Was Not in Vain, Velocity, Emlit Project and Mother Tongues. She wrote two plays for Half Moon Theatre. She has worked with composers Richard Blackford, Kerry Andrew, choreographer Rosemary Lee, visual artist Robin Whitemore and playwright Mary Cooper.

She has performed at venues including the Museum of London, Edinburgh Fringe Festival, Cambridge Water Stone, Liberty Radio, Battersea Arts Centre, Lauderdale House, the Commonwealth Institute, British Library, British Council of Bangladesh, Takshila in Pakistan and New York. Her residencies have included, Tower Hamlets Summer University, Sunderland City Library and Arts Centre, East Side Arts, Poetry Society, Magic Me, Rich Mix, Kinetika, Bromley by Bow Centre, Half Moon Theatre, and Apples and Snakes.

Azad is a trustee of Rich Mix in Bethnal Green, founder chair of Bishwo Shahitto Kendro (World Literature Centre UK) in London. She is part of the East storytelling group, which invites local residents to join in sharing some of the stories brought together by the Eastend's rich, diverse history of immigration.

Awards
Azad received the Bangladesh "Bichitra Award" in 1994, "Year of the Artist" Award from London Arts in 2000, "Sonjojon- A Rouf" Award in 2004, and UK "Civic Award" in 2004. Community Champions Award in 2014 by Canary Wharf group PLC. In 2016, she was awarded "Syed Waliullah Literature Award"2016, which is conferred by the Bangla Academy.

Personal life
Azad lives in Wanstead, Redbridge, London.

Works

Novel and stories

Poetry

Children's literature and drama

Poetry collections and translations

See also

 British Bangladeshi
 Performance poetry
 List of British Bangladeshis
 List of Bengali poets
 List of English writers
 List of Muslim writers and poets
 List of performance poets

References

External links
 
 Mahboob, Mahdin. Creative Writing Workshop @ BRAC University by Shamim Azad. Star Campus (The Daily Star), Volume 2, Issue 31, 12 August 2007
 Kvist, Elsie. Author Shamim Azad helps children mark the end of London Games at Three Mills in Bromley-by-bow. East London Advertiser. 10 September 2012

1952 births
Living people
20th-century British novelists
21st-century British novelists
20th-century British poets
21st-century British poets
20th-century British women writers
21st-century British women writers
British Muslims
Bangladeshi emigrants to England
British women novelists
British people of Bangladeshi descent
Naturalised citizens of the United Kingdom
Bangladeshi women writers
Bangladeshi writers
British Asian writers
Bangladeshi women poets
British women poets
Muslim poets
Bengali-language poets
English-language poets
Writers from London
People from Mymensingh District
People from Wanstead